Alexander II (Greek: Άλέξανδρος) was a king of Epirus, and the son of Pyrrhus and Lanassa, the daughter of the Sicilian tyrant Agathocles.

Reign
He succeeded his father as king in 272 BC, and continued the war which his father had begun with Antigonus II Gonatas, whom he succeeded in driving from the kingdom of Macedon.  He was, however, dispossessed of both Macedon and Epirus by Demetrius II of Macedon, the son of Antigonus II; upon which he took refuge amongst the Acarnanians. By their assistance and that of his own subjects, who entertained a great attachment for him, he recovered Epirus. It appears that he was in alliance with the Aetolians. 

Alexander married his paternal half-sister Olympias, by whom he had two sons, Pyrrhus ΙΙ, Ptolemy ΙΙ and a daughter, Phthia. Beloch places the death of King Alexander II "about 255", and supports this date with an elaborate chain of reasoning. On the death of Alexander, Olympias assumed the regency on behalf of her sons, and married Phthia to Demetrius.  There are extant silver and copper coins of this king.  The former bear a youthful head covered with the skin of an elephant's head.  The reverse represents Pallas holding a spear in one hand and a shield in the other, and before her stands an eagle on a thunderbolt.

References

Sources
Connop Thirlwall, History of Greece, vol. viii
Johann Gustav Droysen, Hellenismus
Benediktus Niese, Geschichte der griechischen und makedonischen Staaten
Karl Julius Beloch, Griechische Geschichte vol. iii.

 
 

Buddhism in the ancient Mediterranean
Rulers of Ancient Epirus
3rd-century BC Greek people
3rd-century BC rulers
Pyrrhus of Epirus
Year of birth unknown
240s BC deaths